Jesse DeWitt Sexton (September 6, 1885 – August 28, 1948) was an American Democratic politician.

Early life
Born near Paradise in Clay County, Sexton was educated in the public schools of Kearney, the Central Missouri State Teachers College, and the Polytechnic Institute and the Southwestern Optical College of Kansas City.

Professional and legislative career
Sexton was a farmer. He served in the Missouri General Assembly.

Sexton was first elected to the Missouri Senate in 1936. He was also elected County Judge of Clinton County in 1934.

References

External links
 Jesse Sexton, Find a Grave

1885 births
1948 deaths
20th-century American politicians
Democratic Party Missouri state senators